Flying Squadron may refer to:
Flying Squadron (1869), a Royal Navy squadron
Flying Squadron (1870), a Royal Navy squadron including HMS Volage
Flying Squadron (1896), a British Royal Navy squadron
Flying Squadron (United States Navy), a U.S. Navy squadron that fought in the Spanish–American War
Flying Squadron of America, a temperance organization
Flying Squadron (film), a 1949 Italian adventure film
Escadron volant ("Flying squadron"), Ladies-in-waiting at Catherine de' Medici's court
Squadrone Volante ("Flying Squadron"),  a 17th-century group of liberal cardinals of the Roman Catholic Church

See also
Flying Squad, a branch of the Specialist Crime Directorate